Christophe Chaptal de Chanteloup Managing Partner of Experience makers and Publishing Director of Design fax. Born in Versailles, (France) on December 26, 1961.

Education and career 

Christophe Chaptal de Chanteloup graduated from the ESDI-Creapole School of Industrial Design in 1986. While still a student, he founded Design Service, an industrial design consultancy which quickly became one of the reference agencies in the product design sector.
In 1993, he became a Managing Partner of the organizational development consultancy Arion during which he wrote his first book on design "Le Design : la stratégie du profit et du plaisir" published by Dunod.
In 1995, Christophe joined the Groupe SEB (the world leader in small domestic appliances) to take up a position as Product Director and, subsequently, as VP Strategic Marketing for the Food and Beverage Preparation Business Unit where he launched the Rondo and Universo ranges as well as a hundred other products.
In April 2001, he was appointed VP Marketing, Design & Communications at Peugeot Motocycles where he notably launched the Ludix and Satelis ranges. 
In 2005 he moved to Automobiles Peugeot (Stellantis) where he assumed responsibility for organizational development assignments (internal audits, integration of the Lean method in the retail subsidiaries).
Since 2009, Christophe Chaptal de Chanteloup is Managing Partner of Experience makers (formerly CC&A Consulting)., a strategy, organization and transformation firm focused on experience. He is also Publishing Director of Design fax, the reference media for French design and was President of the French national design association APCI-Promotion du design from December 2017 to January 2019.

Publications and research interests 
Christophe Chaptal de Chanteloup has published several books and articles about strategy, design, management and marketing:

-   Le design - Levier clé de performance de l'entreprise, Design fax, 2022

-   "Leviers de croissance et expérience", Forbes, 2021

-   "Management transversal : la nouvelle donne", Forbes, 2021

-   "La satisfaction étudiant dans les institutions d'enseignement supérieur", Forbes, 2021

-   "Augmenter satisfaction client et performance opérationnelle", Forbes, 2021

-   "La relation client une longue histoire - Caisse des Dépôts - Partenaire des palmes de la relation client", AFRC, 2020

-   "Comment le design peut contribuer à l'économie française ?", Forbes, 2020

-   "Relier parcours client et processus pour une meilleure performance, Forbes, 2020

-   "Le Responsive Management : pour une organisation plus réactive, plus autonome et plus performante", Forbes, 2020

-   "Le design organisationnel pour piloter et transformer l’entreprise", Forbes, 2019

-   "Management : gérer les injonctions contradictoires", Forbes, 2019

-   "Expérience client : Les 5 clés pour réussir", Forbes, 2019

-   "Standardisation ou personnalisation : quelle stratégie choisir pour vendre plus (et mieux) ?", Harvard Business Review, 2019

-   "L’expérience client en temps de crise", Harvard Business Review, 2019

-	L'expérience client et son modèle économique, written with Isabelle Macquart, Design fax, 2018

-   "Les assistants personnels vont-ils tuer les marques ?", Harvard Business Review, 2018

-   "Une transformation digitale réussie ne suffit pas à rendre viable un modèle économique vieillissant : les exemples d’Air France-KLM et de la SNCF", Harvard Business Review, 2018

-   "Le syndrome Vélib’, ou comment changer pour faire moins bien", Harvard Business Review, 2018

-	“Joon d’Air France-KLM : une expérience client pour le moins surprenante", Harvard Business Review, 2017

-	“Quatre stratégies pour anticiper l’avenir de l’automobile", Harvard Business Review, 2017

-	“Expérience client : méfiez-vous de l’effet clown triste", Harvard Business Review, 2017

-	“La smart city, un investissement d’avenir", Harvard Business Review, 2016

-   "Apple, Audi, Danone : et si vous preniez exemple sur les plus grands ?", Harvard Business Review, 2016

-   "Uber, BlaBlaCar : Il y a les champions de l’offre globale, et les autres", Harvard Business Review, 2016

-	Le manifeste du faire — Design making : un nouveau modèle économique pour passer de l'idée au marché, Fyp éditions, 2016

-	“Le design making”, Linkedin Pulse, 2015

-   "Pour deux degrés de plus", Harvard Business Review, 2015

-   "Qu’est-ce que le « vrai » luxe ?", Harvard Business Review, 2015

-	“L’affaire Volkswagen : et si ce n’était que la partie émergée de l’iceberg ?”, Harvard Business Review, 2015

-	“La leçon marketing de Tesla”, Harvard Business Review, 2015

-	“Apple Watch, un coup marketing bien orchestré”, Harvard Business Review, 2015

-	La chaîne de valeur de l’offre, De Boeck, 2015

-	Le marketing de rupture, De Boeck, 2014

-	Les 7 erreurs stratégiques à éviter, cc&a. éditions, 2012

-	Les 7 péchés capitaux du marketing, cc&a. éditions, 2012

-	Les 3P : Plaisir, Partage, Profit, Vuibert, 2012

-	Le Design – Management stratégique et opérationnel, Vuibert, 2011

-	Mots et maux du management, Vuibert, 2011, Vuibert

-	 1994

-	Le Design : la stratégie du profit et du plaisir, Dunod, 1993

-	 1993

Teaching activities 
Alongside his professional activities, Christophe Chaptal de Chanteloup also teaches in a number of institutions of higher education, notably:

-	Sciences Po (the top-tier School of Political Science in Paris): lecturer in business strategy, teaching with the framework of the Executive Education program in strategy and marketing,

-	Centrale Paris (one of the leading French schools of engineering): lecturer within the framework of the Executive Education program in design management,

-	IFP School: a lecturer in the Economics & Management Center (CEG) specializing in marketing and design management.

Awards and distinctions 
Christophe Chaptal de Chanteloup has won a dozen marketing and design awards:
2008: President of the Creapole Master’s Program
2005 and 2006: Observeur du Design and Motorcycle Design Award
2003, 2004 and 2005: Motorcycle Design Award, Prix du Sénat, Étoile de l’Observeur du Design and Trophée Stratégies – Marketing des Jeunes
2005, 2004 and 2003, 1990 and 1988: Janus de l’Industrie
2002: Motorcycle Design Award
1999: Montgolfier de la Société d’Encouragement pour l’Industrie Nationale (S.P.I.)

References

Internal link 
Design management

External links 
 Experience makers
 http://design-fax.fr

Living people
1961 births
People from Versailles
French industrial designers